The Chicago Women's Hall of Fame was created in 1988 by the Chicago Commission on Women to recognize the endeavors of women to improve their socio-economic and political quality of life in the City of Chicago, United States. The awards were distributed each August and photographs and biographies of the inductees were placed in City Hall to inspire others to aim for excellence. August was chosen to commemorate the passage of the 19th Amendment, which occurred on August 26, 1920.

References

External links 
Mollie West at Induction Ceremony

Women's halls of fame
1988 establishments in Illinois
Halls of fame in Chicago
Women in Chicago
History of women in Illinois